Christopher Roper may refer to:

Christopher Roper (legal educator) (born 1944), Australian lawyer and educator
Christopher Roper (MP) (1509–1559), English politician
Christopher Roper, 2nd Baron Teynham (1561–1622), British aristocrat
Christopher Roper, South African editor, see Mail & Guardian
Christopher Roper-Curzon, 19th Baron Teynham (1896–1972), British naval officer and English peer
Chris Roper (born 1991), English cricketer